40 let Oktyabrya is a rural locality (a settlement) in Dzerzhinskoye Rural Settlement of Kashirsky District, Russia. The population was 44 as of 2010.

Streets 
 40 let Oktyabrya

Geography 
40 let Oktyabrya is located 44 km west of Kashirskoye (the district's administrative centre) by road. Imeni Dzerzhinskogo is the nearest rural locality.

References 

Rural localities in Kashirsky District, Voronezh Oblast